Tenderloin may refer to:

Food
 Beef tenderloin
 Pork tenderloin

Neighborhoods
 Tenderloin, Manhattan
 Tenderloin, San Francisco

Entertainment
 Tenderloin (film), a 1928 film
 Tenderloin (musical), a musical from 1960
 Tenderloin (novel), by Samuel Hopkins Adams
 "Tenderloin", a song by Blue Öyster Cult from Agents of Fortune, 1976
 "Tenderloin", a song by Rancid from Let's Go
The Tenderloins, an American improv comedy troupe, creators of Impractical Jokers

See also

 
 
 
 Tenderloin district (disambiguation)
 Tender (disambiguation)
 Loin